The Vermilion Pencil is a 1922 American silent drama film directed by Norman Dawn, and  produced and distributed by Robertson–Cole. It is based on the eponymous 1908 novel by Homer Lea. The film stars Japanese actor Sessue Hayakawa in multiple roles, and white actors Ann May, Bessie Love, and Sidney Franklin, all in Asian roles. It is now a lost film.

After completing this film, Hayakawa learned that members of the studio who made the film were active in the anti-Japanese movement, and he left Hollywood for over a decade.

Production 
Extras were cast from Chinatown, Los Angeles, and the value of the costumes worn by the principals cost $20,000. To darken her hair for the film, Bessie Love used mascara. Despite this, Love called the film "thoughtfully produced".

Exteriors were filmed in the Sierra Nevada mountains. Some scenes were filmed at the Hollywood home of Adolph and Eugene Bernheimer, now the Japanese restaurant Yamashiro.

Plot 

In China, Tse Chan (Hayakawa) flees to the mountains after his wife (May) is executed under the command of the unscrupulous Ling Chee.

His son Li Chan (also Hayakawa), who has grown up in America, returns to China many years later as a successful civil engineer. Li falls in love with the beautiful Hyacinth (Love), who is betrothed to the viceroy Fu Wong (Franklin). Li takes a position as Hyacinth's private tutor, and the pair escape to the mountains.

They hide in the crater of a volcano and are captured when they nearly suffocate from the fumes. The viceroy is about to have them executed when The Unknown (also Hayakawa) helps them escape by sacrificing himself in the volcano, causing it to erupt.

Cast 

 Sessue Hayakawa as Tse Chan / Li Chan / The Unknown
 Ann May as Tse Chan's wife
 Misao Seki as Pai Wang
 Bessie Love as Hyacinth
 Sidney Franklin as Fu Wong
 Thomas Jefferson as Ho Ling
 Tote Du Crow as The Jackal
 Omar Whitehead as Ma Shue
 Lock Chy as Extra (uncredited)

Reception 

The film received generally positive reviews, and was commercially successful. The visuals were consistently acclaimed. Hayakawa's performance received positive reviews. Bessie Love's performance and star power were noted as a box office draw.

See also 
 Examples of yellowface
 Racism in early American film
 Whitewashing in film

References

External links 

 
 
 
 
 

1922 drama films
1922 lost films
1922 films
American black-and-white films
Silent American drama films
American silent feature films
Film Booking Offices of America films
Films based on American novels
Films directed by Norman Dawn
Films set in China
Films shot in Los Angeles
Lost American films
Lost drama films
1920s American films